Giovanni Bonati (born April 17, 1991 in Sarzana, La Spezia) is an Italian Grand Prix motorcycle racer.

Career statistics

By season

Races by year

References

External links
 Profile on motogp.com

1991 births
Living people
Italian motorcycle racers
125cc World Championship riders
People from Sarzana
Sportspeople from the Province of La Spezia